Aigars Vītols (born February 15, 1976) is a former Latvian professional basketball player and a current politician for the Latvian Union of Greens and Farmers.

Sports career
Vītols played the shooting guard position: He played most of his career in Latvia, winning six national championships and one finals MVP award.

When he played for Spanish team Baloncesto Fuenlabrada, he was the best three-point shooter of Liga ACB in the 2005-06 season.

Mostly he was known for his terrific long-range shooting and defensive skills.

Vītols played for Latvia national basketball team at five EuroBaskets.

Pro clubs
1993-94:  VEF/Ādaži
1994-98:  BK Metropole
1998-02:  BK Ventspils
2002:  KD Slovan
2002:  Barons LMT
2002-03:  BK Skonto
2003-05:  BK Ventspils
2005-06:  Baloncesto Fuenlabrada
2006-08:  BK Ventspils
2008-09:  ASK Rīga
2009-11:  Barons LMT
2012-2013:  BK Jēkabpils

Political career
In the 2013 local elections, Vītols was elected for the Ķekava regional council on the Vidzemes party list, but he changed political allegiance in 2016 to the Latvian Farmers' Union. In the 2017 local elections, he was elected to the Ķekava regional council on the LFU list. He was chosen to be the vice mayor.

He failed to get elected as a candidate for the Union of Greens and Farmers in the 13th Latvian national elections.

In September 2019, the Corruption Prevention and Combating Bureau arrested A. Vītols, accusing him of possible bribery in connection with construction work.

References

External links
Eurobasket Profile

1976 births
Living people
ASK Riga players
KD Slovan players
Latvian men's basketball players
Basketball players from Riga
BK Ventspils players
Shooting guards